Spirou may refer to:

In comics
Spirou (character), the eponymous main character of the comics series Spirou et Fantasio and Le Petit Spirou
Spirou (magazine), originally Le Journal de Spirou, Belgian weekly serial comics magazine
Spirou (video game), a video game based on the comics series
Spirou et Fantasio, comics series published in the serial journal and in hardcover book format
Spirou et Fantasio (comic book), a 1948 comic book that precedes the official Spirou et Fantasio series
Spirou et Fantasio (1993 TV series), 1993 animated series
Spirou et Fantasio (2006 TV series), 2006 animated series

Other
Spirou Charleroi, Belgian professional basketball club
Spiroudome, indoor arena in Charleroi, Belgium

See also
Spira (disambiguation)
Spiro (disambiguation)
Spiro (name)